Positive is the third studio album by Japanese producer tofubeats, and his second on a major label. It was released on September 16, 2015, through Warner Music Japan subsidiary unBORDE.

Release 
The album was released on September 16, 2015. The album was preceded by a single, also called Positive, featuring Japanese idol Dream Ami. The album also contains features from musicians such as Tetsuya Komuro and Skylar Spence. A remixes album, titled Positive Remixes, was released on January 20, 2016.

Track listing

Chart positions

References 

Japanese-language albums
Tofubeats albums
Unborde albums
2015 albums